Ramón González (born August 24, 1966) is a retired male javelin thrower from Cuba, who won a total number of three medals (one gold, two silvers) at the Pan American Games during his career.

Achievements

1Representing the Americas

References
 Year Ranking

1966 births
Living people
Cuban male javelin throwers
Athletes (track and field) at the 1983 Pan American Games
Athletes (track and field) at the 1987 Pan American Games
Athletes (track and field) at the 1991 Pan American Games
Pan American Games medalists in athletics (track and field)
Pan American Games gold medalists for Cuba
Pan American Games silver medalists for Cuba
World Athletics Championships athletes for Cuba
Goodwill Games medalists in athletics
Competitors at the 1986 Central American and Caribbean Games
Competitors at the 1990 Central American and Caribbean Games
Central American and Caribbean Games gold medalists for Cuba
Central American and Caribbean Games medalists in athletics
Competitors at the 1990 Goodwill Games
Medalists at the 1983 Pan American Games
Medalists at the 1987 Pan American Games
Medalists at the 1991 Pan American Games
20th-century Cuban people